The Great Lakes Conference is an OHSAA athletics conference that began play with the 2015-16 school year.  The following are members:

Members

League history
As part of a significant realignment in Cleveland-area high school leagues at the time, the Great Lakes Conference was formed in 2015 by seven schools that were located in Cleveland's west suburbs and had similar competition levels.  Normandy, Parma, and Valley Forge came from the former Northeast Ohio Conference, Bay, Elyria Catholic, and Rocky River came from the former West Shore Conference, and Holy Name came from the North Coast League.

The league added Buckeye and Fairview in 2019.  Buckeye and Fairview were two of four schools being left out after eight of the 12 Patriot Athletic Conference schools decided to form a new league with more compact traveling distances.

On April 16, 2019, it was announced that Lakewood would join for the 2020-21 school year, leaving the Southwestern Conference in order to do so.

On February 20, 2020, it was announced that North Olmsted and Westlake would join for the 2021-22 school year, bring the GLC's membership to 12 schools.  Both schools came from the Southwestern Conference.  With 12 members, the GLC will split into two divisions for some sports.  The East Division will consists of Buckeye, Holy Name, Lakewood, Normandy, Parma, and Valley Forge; the West Division consists of Bay, Elyria Catholic, Fairview, North Olmsted, Rocky River, and Westlake.

Rivalries 
The major rivalries in the GLC include the following:

(Interdivisional)

Lakewood Rangers vs Rocky River Pirates

(Divisional)

(West): Bay Village Rockets vs Westlake Demons

(East): Parma Senior Redmen vs Normandy Invaders

Championships 
This information is of clearly stated champions according to the available end of season reports by the Great Lakes Conference from years 2015-2021.

References

Sports organizations established in 2015
Sports in Greater Cleveland
Ohio high school sports conferences
2015 establishments in Ohio